Zgornje Palovče (in older sources also Zgornje Paloviče) is a settlement in the hills east of Kamnik in the Upper Carniola region of Slovenia.

A 350-year-old farmhouse in the settlement, known as the Budnar House, has been converted into a small museum. It has a shingled roof and much of the original furnishings, including a smoke kitchen and a prayer corner. Various exhibitions are periodically held in what used to be the barn.

References

External links

on Geopedia

Populated places in the Municipality of Kamnik